Divine is a 1935 French drama film directed by Max Ophüls and starring Simone Berriau, George Rigaud and Gina Manès.

The film's sets were designed by the art director Jacques Gotko and Robert Gys. It was shot at the Billancourt Studios in Paris and on location in Hyeres.

Synopsis
A girl from the countryside travels to Paris, only to find herself working in a music hall.

Cast
 Simone Berriau as Divine 
 George Rigaud as Le Lait 
 Gina Manès as Dora 
 Philippe Hériat as Lutuf-Allah 
 Sylvette Fillacier as Gitanette 
 Paul Azaïs as Victor 
 Catherine Fonteney as Mme Jarisse 
 Thérèse Dorny as La Poison 
 Jeanne Fusier-Gir as Mme. Nicou, Concierge
 Jeanne Véniat as Mme Martelli 
 Nane Germon as Zaza 
 Yvette Lebon as Roberte 
 Marcel Vallée as Le Directeur 
 Roger Gaillard as Pierre Paul 
 André Gabriello as Coirol 
 Pierre Juvenet as Le concierge 
 Floyd Du Pont as Fergusson 
 Lucien Callamand as 1er Police Inspecteur 
 Tony Murcy as 2ème Inspecteur

References

Bibliography 
 Williams, Alan L. Republic of Images: A History of French Filmmaking. Harvard University Press, 1992.

External links 
 

1935 films
1930s French-language films
Films directed by Max Ophüls
1935 drama films
French drama films
Films shot at Billancourt Studios
French black-and-white films
1930s French films